Pseudomogrus mirandus is a jumping spider (family Salticidae) that is found in Turkmenistan. The species was first described by Wanda Wesołowska in 1996 and placed in the genus Yllenus but was transferred to the genus Logunyllus in 2016, and to Pseudomogrus when Logunyllus was synonymized with Pseudomogrus.

References

Spiders described in 1996
Salticidae
Spiders of Asia
Taxa named by Wanda Wesołowska